Grafham may refer to the following places in England:

 Grafham, Cambridgeshire, a village in the county of Cambridgeshire
 Grafham, Surrey, a village in the county of Surrey

See also 
 Grafham Water, a reservoir in the county of Cambridgeshire
 Graffham, a village in West Sussex
 Operation Graffham, an Allied operation during World War II